La Zulianita is a Venezuelan telenovela written by Cuban writer Delia Fiallo and produced by Venevisión in 1977.

Lupita Ferrer and José Bardina starred as the main protagonists with Chelo Rodríguez as the antagonist.

Plot
María Marta Domínguez is a humble provincial girl from Zulia who goes to Caracas in search of new and better opportunities, though she does not possess skills to help her land a job. When she reaches Caracas, she stays with her cousin who works as a prostitute in a bar called "La Zulianita".  One night, while working at the bar, an unscrupulous client called Lastra who is the Zulianita Promotions Specialties, tries to take advantage of María, but she defends herself. Outraged, Lastra accuses her of stealing his wallet. María is sent to jail, but is soon released through the help of  Claudio Linares, a kind lawyer  dedicated to helping people who have no resources, since he too was imprisoned unjustly.

María gets a job at the home of the Arocha's, a  wealthy family in the city. The  family is composed of Felipe Arocha, his wife Amelia, their children Juan Carlos who is an engineer, Jesus and Jenny, his aunt Olga and her children Diana and Tony. Back in the house, María meets and falls for Juan Carlos, although Claudio, who has since become a close friend to María, advises her that this family cannot be trusted because they sent him to jail accusing him of the death of his wife and daughter. María and Juan Carlos started a romance, and he breaks off his engagement to his girlfriend Idania Ferran.

Cast

 Lupita Ferrer as Martha María Domínguez 
 José Bardina as Juan Carlos Arocha y Pimentel 
 Chelo Rodríguez as Idania Ferrán
 Enrique Soto as Aquiles 
 Orlando Urdaneta as Rafael 
 Luis Abreu as Jesús 
 Caridad Canelón as Dorita 
 Eva Blanco as Olga 
 José Luis Silva as Roly 
 Martín Lantigua as Franco  
 Eduardo Serrano as Hernán 
 Esperanza Magaz as Matilde 
 Ana Castell as Queta  
 Enrique Alzugaray as Papelón 
 Ivonne Attas as Rosa Francia 
 Haydée Balza as Greta
 Marita Capote as Linda 
 Martha Carbillo as Mechita  
 Olga Castillo as Morocota 
 Willy Chirino as Él mismo 
 Sandra Dalton as Felisia 
 Renee de Pallas as Amelia de Arocha 
 Chela D'Gar as Migdalia 
 Elisa Escámez as Nury 
 Elena Fariaz ... Carmita  
 Fernando Flores as Elin 
 Humberto García as Oscar Chacón 
 Gustavo González as El Tuerto 
 María Hinojosa as María 
 Martha Lancaste as Madame Yolan 
 Jesús Maella as Aurelio Domínguez  
 Herminia Martínez as Saby  
 Juan Manuel Montesinos as Médico  
 Héctor Monteverde as Felipe Arocha 
 Flor Núñez as Aidé 
 José Oliva as Fermín 
 Omar Omaña as Tony 
 Margot Pareja as Inocencia  
 Alejandra Pinedo as Jenny Arocha 
 Manuel Poblete as  Leyva 
 Leopoldo Regnault as David 
 Soledad Rojas as Olaya 
 Fernanda Ruizos as Alexia Arocha Ferrán
 Augusto Romero as Juan Carlitos 
 Chumico Romero as Corito 
 Betty Ruth as Julia  
 Mary Soliani as Diana 
 Carlos Subero as Claudio Linares 
 Alfonso Urdaneta as Nicolás 
 Franklin Virgüez as David 
 Raúl Xiqués as Ricardo Lastra

References

External links

1977 telenovelas
Venevisión telenovelas
Venezuelan telenovelas
1977 Venezuelan television series debuts
1977 Venezuelan television series endings
Spanish-language telenovelas
Television shows set in Caracas